Martin Erat (born August 29, 1981) is a Czech former professional ice hockey player. He played in the National Hockey League for the Nashville Predators, Washington Capitals and the Phoenix/Arizona Coyotes.

Playing career
Erat was selected in the seventh round, 191st overall, of the 1999 NHL Entry Draft by the Nashville Predators, the team's 12th choice in the draft

Erat made a splash in his NHL rookie year in 2001–02 as a member of the "vowel line", which consisted of himself on left wing, Vladimír Országh on right wing and Denis Arkhipov at centre. His first NHL point was a game-winning goal against the Calgary Flames on October 11, 2001. That year, he set a then Nashville rookie record for games played (80), assists (24) and points (33).

Erat struggled in his sophomore season in 2002–03 and spent the majority of the season with the Predators' American Hockey League (AHL) affiliate, the Milwaukee Admirals. After changing his number from 19 to 10 in the off-season, his play improved in his third season, 2003–04. He notched then career highs with goals (16), assists (33) and points (49), also ranking second on the team with a +10 plus-minus rating. Erat's first Stanley Cup playoff point was an assist in the 2004 Western Conference Quarterfinals in a 2–1 loss to the Detroit Red Wings on April 10, 2004.

During the 2004–05 NHL lockout, Erat played for HC Zlín of the Czech Extraliga, where he finished eighth in the league in scoring with 20 goals and 23 assists in 48 games.

In 2005–06, Erat scored a career-high 20 goals in his fourth season with the Predators, tallying 49 points. He also played for the Czech national team at the 2006 Winter Olympics in Turin, where he helped the team secure a bronze medal.

During the 2006–07 season, Erat emerged as a legitimate first-line player, tallying 57 points in 68 games. Most often, Erat teamed with Paul Kariya and David Legwand to form the team's top unit. However, Erat missed the final five weeks of the season with a torn medial collateral ligament (MCL).

In 2007–08, Erat posted a new career-high of 23 goals and added 34 assists to once again reach the 57-point plateau. Following the 2007–08 season, he signed a seven-year, $31.5 million contract extension with the Predators. He has two career hat-tricks, the first against the Edmonton Oilers and the second against the Vancouver Canucks on December 8, 2009.

On April 3, 2013, the Predators traded Erat and Michael Latta to the Washington Capitals at the NHL trade deadline in exchange for prospect Filip Forsberg. Erat requested the trade away from Nashville and waived a no-trade clause in his contract to facilitate the deal.

On November 25, 2013, Erat requested a trade for the second time since being traded to the Capitals, just eight months prior. Erat first asked for a trade in October after being demoted to the team's fourth line. Erat's second request for a trade came after he was a healthy scratch for the first time in his career. Erat has said he would waive his no-trade clause, claiming it is "time to move on".

On the eve of the 2013–14 NHL trade deadline, on March 4, Erat was traded (alongside John Mitchell) to the Phoenix Coyotes in exchange for Chris Brown, Rostislav Klesla and a fourth-round pick in 2015.

After 13 seasons and 881 regular season games in the NHL, Erat left North America as a free agent and signed a one-year contract with Russian club Avangard Omsk of the Kontinental Hockey League (KHL) on September 17, 2015. In May 2016, he returned to the Czech Extraliga and signed a contract with HC Kometa Brno. On April 19, 2017, Erat helped the team claim its 12th championship, after a 51-year drought. Erat retired on May 30, 2019.

International play
Erat played for the Czech Republic national team at the 2001 World Junior Ice Hockey Championships, helping the team win the gold medal. In 2006, he played for the bronze medal-winning Czech team at the 2006 Winter Olympics in Turin. That same year, Erat was also a member of the silver medal-winning team from the 2006 IIHF World Championship in Riga.

Erat was called up to replace Vladimír Sobotka on the Czech team for the 2014 Winter Olympics in Sochi. Erat reprised his role on the Czech team in the 2018 Winter Olympics in Pyeongchang.

Personal
Martin has an older brother, Roman, who currently plays for HC Kometa Brno in the Czech Extraliga.

Career statistics

Regular season and playoffs

International

Awards
Named the WHL Eastern Conference Player of the Month for November, 2000.
Named the WHL Player of the Week for November 13–19, 2000.
Named the NHL Third Star of the Week for November 12–18, 2007.
Named the NHL Second Star of the Week for March 12–18, 2012.

References

External links

1981 births
Living people
Arizona Coyotes players
Avangard Omsk players
Czech ice hockey right wingers
Ice hockey players at the 2006 Winter Olympics
Ice hockey players at the 2010 Winter Olympics
Ice hockey players at the 2014 Winter Olympics
Ice hockey players at the 2018 Winter Olympics
HC Kometa Brno players
Medalists at the 2006 Winter Olympics
Milwaukee Admirals players
Nashville Predators draft picks
Nashville Predators players
Olympic bronze medalists for the Czech Republic
Olympic ice hockey players of the Czech Republic
Olympic medalists in ice hockey
Sportspeople from Třebíč
Phoenix Coyotes players
Red Deer Rebels players
Saskatoon Blades players
Washington Capitals players
PSG Berani Zlín players
Czech expatriate ice hockey players in Canada
Czech expatriate ice hockey players in the United States
Czech expatriate ice hockey players in Russia